A Fine Mess is a 1986 American comedy film written and directed by Blake Edwards and starring Ted Danson and Howie Mandel.

The film was intended as a remake of Laurel & Hardy's classic short The Music Box" and was to be semi-improvised in the same style as the director's earlier comedy The Party, but studio interference, poor previews and subsequent re-editing resulted in the film becoming a fully scripted chase comedy with very little of the original ideas for the film remaining intact. Writer/director Blake Edwards actually gave television interviews telling audiences to avoid the film. It received overwhelmingly negative reviews and performed poorly at the box office.

Plot
While filming on location at a race track, womanizing bit actor Spencer Holden, who lives life on one scam after another, overhears a couple of inept thugs named Binky and Turnip while they dope a race horse with a supposed undetectable super stimulant. The thugs find out that Spence overheard them and will do anything to catch him to prevent him from going to the authorities with the information. Spence, however, enlists the help of his best friend, drive-in carhop and aspiring restaurateur Dennis Powell, to bet on the race with that horse so that they can make some guaranteed money. Spence and Dennis end up having to outrun not only the thugs, who manage to put a few bullet holes in Spence's car, but also the police after they find Spence's bullet-riddled car and after the race horse, Sorry Sue, dies from the drugs. The plot also includes an antique player piano of which Dennis comes into possession, sympathetic but naive auction house employee Ellen Frankenthaler who is attracted to Dennis, and exotically beautiful Claudia Pazzo, the wife of local Italian mob boss Tony Pazzo, who is interested in buying the piano and whom Spence can't resist.

Cast

Critical reception
A Fine Mess received heavily negative reviews, including one from The New York Times, which stated "Mr. Edwards, who on happier occasions gave us the Pink Panther movies, piles on the pileups until you may suspect that he is trying to distract the audience from the absence of a diverting story or dialogue. The 11 musical numbers by some well-known performers (available, you can bet, on record and cassette) seem designed for the same purpose."

On review aggregator Rotten Tomatoes, the film has an approval rating of 25% based on 8 reviews, with an average score of 4.70/10. On Metacritic, the film has a weighted average score of 35 out of 100 based on 11 critics, indicating "generally unfavorable reviews".

Then-U.S. President Ronald Reagan viewed this film at Camp David on September 12, 1986.

Soundtrack

"Can't Help Falling In Love" – Christine McVie
"Easier Said Than Done" – Chico DeBarge
"A Fine Mess" – Temptations (#63 R&B/#28 AC)
"I'm Gonna Be A Wheel Someday" – Los Lobos
"Love's Closing In" – Nick Jameson
"Moving So Close" – Keith Burston & Darryl Littlejohn
"Slow Down" – Billy Vera & Beaters
"Stan And Ollie" – Henry Mancini
"Walk Like A Man" – Mary Jane Girls (#41 HOT 100/#91 R&B)
"Wishful Thinking" – Smokey Robinson

References

External links

 
 
 
 

1986 films
1980s crime comedy films
American crime comedy films
American slapstick comedy films
Columbia Pictures films
1980s English-language films
Films directed by Blake Edwards
Films with screenplays by Blake Edwards
Adultery in films
Films scored by Henry Mancini
Films about the American Mafia
Mafia comedy films
1986 comedy films
1980s American films
English-language crime comedy films